Protoparachronistis is a genus of moth in the family Gelechiidae.

Species
 Protoparachronistis concolor Omelko, 1986
 Protoparachronistis discedens Omelko, 1986
 Protoparachronistis initialis Omelko, 1986
 Protoparachronistis policapitis Omelko, 1993

References

Gelechiinae